Richard Stithem (born August 19, 1953) is an American luger. He competed in the men's singles event at the 1980 Winter Olympics.

References

External links
 

1953 births
Living people
American male lugers
Olympic lugers of the United States
Lugers at the 1980 Winter Olympics
People from Panguitch, Utah